Vidian Valérius (born 24 June 1988) is a Guadeloupe football player who plays as forward for FC Fleury 91 and the Guadeloupe national football team.

International career

International goals
Scores and results Guadeloupe's goal tally first.

Early life

At an early age, Vidian started had a partiality for basketball but began to play football before or around the age of 13.

Career

He started his career in France with Paris FC.

Soon after the National Cup of regions in Clairefontaine, Paris FC recruited him, but he only spent one season there.

He was the third top scorer in the Championnat de France Amateur Group D in 2014 with 11 goals.

In 2014, Valérius signed for FC Fleury 91.

In 2013, he signed for Stade Bordelais.

Late in 2016, he signed for AS Vitré.

In 2018, he signed for FC Saint-Louis Neuweg.

In 2020, he signed for Phare Petit-Canal.

He is a Guadeloupe international.

References

External links
 Vidian Valérius : « Temps de jeu et stabilité »
 Vidian Valérius, un air de relance
 
 

Guadeloupean footballers
Guadeloupe international footballers
Association football forwards
Paris FC players
Living people
1988 births
FC Fleury 91 players
People from Saint-Claude, Guadeloupe